Ruby City is a ghost town in Elko County, Nevada, United States. It was a planned city of 75 families, established seven miles south of Arthur, Nevada in 1912.

History
Ruby City was created by land promoters from Utah who had purchased  and built 75 homes. In 1915, there was a hotel, two schools, a water canal and a chapel of the Church of Jesus Christ of Latter-day Saints (LDS Church). However, because of water issues and bad soil, the community was abandoned by 1918 and became a ghost town.

References

Ghost towns in Elko County, Nevada
Ghost towns in Nevada